The Assembly of Believers' Church In India (also known as ABC in India) is a neocharismatic Episcopal denomination in India, rooted in the Saint Thomas Christian tradition and history of Christianity in India. It was established in 1973 by Rev. Reginald Burney Clifford and now contains more than 450 churches with around 40000 members.

Assembly of Believers' Church in India is not to be confused with Believers Church, a separate church entity in Asia.

Proposal
There is a proposal to unite to form Church of India, comprising following churches:
 Orthodox Catholic Church (India) 
 Church of South India
 Church of North India
 St. Thomas Evangelical Church of India
 Believers Eastern Church, of Metropolitan Bishop K. P. Yohannan
  Life Boat Church, of Rev. P. Sumit Joshi, Life Boat Foundation India 
 Assembly of Believers' Church In India, of Bishop Rev. Bishop Augustus Anthony
 Anglican Church of India, of Bishop Stephen Vattapara
 Anglican Catholic Church (Church of India, Pakistan, Burma & Ceylon / CIPBC), of Bishop John Augustine
 The Traditional Anglican Church of India, of Bishop Bishop Hepworth and Bishop Samuel. P. Prakash
 Anglican National Church of India, of Bishop Jonathan Anzar
 United Church of India, of Bishop Sunny Abraham Panachamootil

References

External links
Website of a youth wing of the Assembly of Believers' Church in India

Christian denominations in India
Christian organizations established in 1973
Charismatic denominations